Nephele lannini is a moth of the family Sphingidae. It is known from highland forests in Zimbabwe, Malawi and southern Tanzania.

References

Nephele (moth)
Moths described in 1926
Moths of Africa
Lepidoptera of Malawi
Lepidoptera of Tanzania
Lepidoptera of Zambia
Lepidoptera of Zimbabwe